Karen Blachford (born January 26, 1966) is a Canadian wheelchair curler. She was on the team that won gold in wheelchair curling at the 2006 Winter Paralympics.

Results

References

External links 
 
 Athlete info, .paralympic.ca
 Medallists from previous Paralympic Winter Games - Mixed
 Curling at the Paralympics

1966 births
Living people
Curlers from Ontario
Canadian wheelchair curlers
Medalists at the 2006 Winter Paralympics
Paralympic gold medalists for Canada
Paralympic wheelchair curlers of Canada
Sportspeople from Brockville
Wheelchair curlers at the 2006 Winter Paralympics
Paralympic medalists in wheelchair curling
Canadian wheelchair curling champions